ICC East Asia-Pacific is the International Cricket Council region responsible for administration of the sport of cricket in East Asia and the Pacific area.

The region was founded in 1996 with a regional office established in 1999. The area covered by the region includes two Test nations, four ICC associate members and five ICC affiliate nations.

The region is headed by the Regional Development Manager, Andrew Faichney, based in Australia at the offices of Cricket Australia. The region is supported by the Australian and New Zealand cricket team and these are the only official Test cricket members in the region. The five Test cricket countries in Asia (Afghanistan, Bangladesh, India, Pakistan and Sri Lanka who are playing in South Asia) are members of the Asian Cricket Council.

The EAP is responsible for International tournaments and events, such as: participation in competitions, coaching courses (coach education), umpiring courses, youth development and training; junior/schools programs, administration development, marketing and cricket campsites within the region.

Tournaments
EAP is also responsible for organising the ICC EAP Cricket Trophy, which is the regional international championship competition and allows teams within the region to attempt to qualify for the Cricket World Cup in One Day International and Twenty20 matches and other competitions such as Test cricket. The ICC EAP Cricket Trophy includes the ICC EAP Cricket Trophy (One day), which began in 2005, and ICC EAP Cricket Trophy (Twenty20), which started in 2011.

Other tournaments including the East Asia-Pacific region teams include the Trans-Tasman Trophy (Test) and the Chappell–Hadlee Trophy (ODI) between the only two Test status members Australia and New Zealand.

Member countries

Full Members

Associate Members with ODI and T20I status

Associate Members with T20I status

Map

Former members of the Asian Cricket Council

See also
 Cricket in Oceania

References

External links
International Cricket Council (ICC) Official website
Cricketworld.com – ICC – International Cricket Council

Cricket administration
Sports organizations established in 1996